The AMX-10 RC is a French armoured fighting vehicle manufactured by Nexter Systems for armoured reconnaissance purposes. Equipping French cavalry units since 1981, over 240 remained in service with the French Army in 2021. 108 units were sold to Morocco and 12 to Qatar. "RC" stands for "Roues-Canon", meaning "wheeled gun". The vehicle can be described as a wheeled tank destroyer. It has also been described as a light tank, though its classification as a tank has been disputed; it is described by the term "char" (tank) in French service.

The AMX-10 RC is distinct from the amphibious AMX-10P: they share automotive components, but have completely different battlefield roles. The AMX-10 RC is usually used for reconnaissance missions in dangerous environments or for fire support.

Since 2021, France has been gradually replacing it with the EBRC Jaguar.

Design and development 
Initial work on the AMX-10 RC began in 1970. Prototypes testing began in 1976. The first production vehicle was delivered in 1981 to the 2nd Regiment de Hussards in Sourdun. The vehicle features a powerful GIAT 105 mm gun mounted in a welded aluminium turret. The TK 105 turret houses three crew members, while the driver sits in the front of the hull. A COTAC fire control system is provided for gun aiming. It has a six wheel drive. The AMX-10 RC uses skid steering to turn the hull.

Engine 

In 1985, the Baudouin 6F11 SRX supercharged diesel engine was selected to equip the last production AMX-10 RC vehicles as a production cut-in, as well as for eventual retrofit to all AMX-10 RC vehicles of the French Army.

A 24 volt electrical system with six 12-volt/100-ampere-hour batteries is standard. Two waterjets are used for water propulsion, mounted on each side of the hull at the rear.

Transmission 
The AMX-10 RC vehicles use an unspecified preselector gearbox with four forward and four reverse gear ratios. The clutch is electro-magnetically operated and the gearbox is fitted with a torque converter. A power take-off unit operates the two waterjets. The AMX-10 RC is skid steered and can perform a pivot turn.

Suspension and running gear 
The 6x6 AMX-10 RC is fitted with a hydropneumatic suspension system with variable ground clearance and tilt, provided by Messier Auto-Industry. A centralized lubrication and tire inflation system is fitted. A shock damper is mounted at each wheel station.

Armament 

The AMX-10 RC is fitted with a 105/47 F2 MECA 105 mm medium-pressure gun mounted in a GIAT Industries TK 105 three-man turret. The F2 cannon fires 105×527R proprietary ammunition. The turret uses a SAMM CH49 electrohydraulic gun control system. No stabilization system is fitted. 

An ANF1 7.62 mm machine gun is mounted coaxially to the main armament. Two electrically operated smoke grenade launchers are mounted on each side of the turret. 38 main-gun rounds, 4,000 rounds of 7.62 mm ammunition, and 16 smoke grenades are carried.

The F2 105 mm medium-pressure rifled gun fires four types of 105×527R ammunition: OFL 105 F3 APFSDS, OE 105 F3 HE, OCC 105 F3 HEAT-FS and the BSCC 105 F3 target practice round. The APFSDS, which uses the penetrator from the GIAT OFL 90 F1  mm APFSDS round, is capable of defeating a NATO single heavy tank target at a range of 1,200 metres and the NATO triple heavy tank target at a range of 2,200 metres.

The AMX-10 RC has been upgraded many  times. The DIVT-13 LLTV was replaced by using DIVT-16, 18 and 19 CASTOR thermal sights taken from decommissioned AMX-30B2 MBTs. For its part in the 1991 Gulf War, the AMX-10 RC was provided with extra-high-hardness steel add-on armour and EIREL infrared jammer. The original muzzle brake was replaced by a more efficient one (10% recoil reduction) after the introduction of the OFL 105 F3 APFSDS in 1987. The flotation barrier and the water pump jets were removed (their intakes were sealed).

The AMX-10 RCR introduced a FINDERS C2R battlefield management system. One improvement considered, but not implemented, was the installation of the TML 105 modular light turret armed with a more powerful 105 mm G2 high-pressure gun, as the F2 gun was not compatible with NATO munitions. A central tire inflation system is available for added traction over soft terrain. The AMX-10 RC is equipped with an NBC (Nuclear/Biological/Chemical) protection system and may conduct reconnaissance in a radioactive environment.

AMX-10 RCR modernisation 
In 2010, Nexter completed the modernisation of 256 AMX-10 RC vehicles to the RCR (Rénové; renovated) configuration. This programme integrated various systems and additional armour, active self-protection by SAGEM, LIRE (Leurre InfRarougE, infrared flare), the SIT (Système d'Information Terminal) V1 battlefield management system, Galix smoke grenade launchers, changes in the NBC protection and improvements in the suspension. Speed gearboxes and tactical communications were completed with Thales Communications & Security PR4G VS4. The integration was done by DCMAT (Direction Centrale du Matériel de l'Armée de Terre, Land Army Central Matèriel Directorate).

Variants 
 AMX-10 RC: initial production model with amphibious capability.
 AMX-10 RC surblindé (uparmored): fitted with add-on armor and without amphibious capability.
 AMX-10 RCR revalorisé (upgraded)

Prototypes 
 AMX-10 RTT: APC version.
 AMX-10 RAC: fitted with the TS 90 turret armed with a 90 mm gun.
 AMX-10 RAA: AAA version first presented at Satory in 1981. It featured a large turret armed with two 30 mm autocannons.
 AMX-10 RC with TML 105: AMX-10 RC fitted with the Tourelle Modulaire Légère (Light Modular Turret) featuring a stabilized G2 high-pressure 105 mm gun, GALIX launchers and new sights. A two-man configuration with a bustle-mounted autoloader was available as an option.

Operational history 
The French army's AMX-10 RC has been deployed to many theaters of operation since it was introduced, including the First Gulf War, the War in Afghanistan, in Mali, Kosovo, and Ivory Coast.

Operators

Current operators 
 : 6
 : 248
 : 198
 : 12
 : 14 of an estimated 40 delivered by February 2023.

Missions 
 Armoured reconnaissance
 Armoured support
 Flanking security

References

External links 

 Video of AMX-10RC firing
 Giat-industries.fr
 Federation of American Scientists
 Armour.ws
 Ixarm.com

Armoured cars of France
Fire support vehicles
Military vehicles introduced in the 1980s
Reconnaissance vehicles of the Cold War
Six-wheeled vehicles
Tank destroyers of France
Wheeled reconnaissance vehicles
Wheeled amphibious armoured fighting vehicles